Mintong is a village and Gram Panchayat (GP) in Longding circle of Tirap district in Arunachal Pradesh, India. As per 2011 Census of India, Mintong has a total population of 1,505 peoples, including 730 males and 775 females.

Mington has plantation of tea, coffee, cardamom, bamboo etc. for the economic development.

References 

Arunachal Pradesh
Tirap district